Daniel Krige (born 16 July 1970) is a writer, director and actor. Born in Cape Town, South Africa, he grew up in Australia. Krige began working as a writer at the age of sixteen for Grundy Television.

History
He attended the Australian Film Television and Radio School with Dion Beebe, Rowan Woods, Samantha Lang, Peter Duncan, and Robert Connolly.

Krige began to direct and act at the age of 21. While at the Australian Film, TV and radio school (AFTRS) as a writing student, he wrote the screenplay for the film The Door(1992), from a story by fellow student Josie Keys, who directed the film.  It received the Golden Hugo for Best Student Drama at the Chicago International Film Festival in 1993.  He continued his early successes by writing and directing (and even starring in some of) the short films, Our Feral Friends (1994), Fuckwit (1994), and Happily Ever After (1996). John Polson, director of the Tropfest Film Festival, was third assistant director on Krige's short film Fuckwit.

His film Happily Ever After (1996) came second at Australia's Tropfest Film Festival.

In 2007, Krige directed his debut feature film entitled West. The Age called the film a "surprisingly effective plot-driven atmosphere piece."

Johnette Napolitano of Concrete Blonde fame is the main vocalist on the score to West. She also sings the title song, "Falling in Love".

References

External links
 
 Interview at ABC
 "The Door" short film

Australian screenwriters
Australian television directors
Australian film directors
English-language film directors
1970 births
Writers from Cape Town
Living people
Australian Film Television and Radio School alumni